The Daystate Air Ranger is an air rifle manufactured by Daystate. The Air Ranger was introduced in 1978 and was the first model produced by the company. Several iterations of this rifle have been produced in varying designs and calibres and is currently identified as the Air Ranger mkII 

Initially the gun was designed to fire tranquilliser darts but this was replaced with a pellet firing variant for sporting/pest control purposes.

Stock Variations
The Air Ranger MKII is available with two stock options

Standard Walnut
The standard walnut stock is an ambidextrous stock manufactured by Minelli in Italy and features a thumb hole cut out with knurled and engraved grip and siding.

Tactical
The black synthetic tactical stock is identical in form to the walnut but without the knurled grip and siding.

Model Variants
The air ranger is available in the UK in four power options dependent on the calibre and license requirements

Air Ranger MKII
This variant as standard has a 400cc cylinder capacity with the option of upgrading to a 500cc capacity.

Air Ranger Extreme MKII

References

Pneumatic weapons
Air guns of the United Kingdom